Surveys in Geophysics is an academic journal published by Springer about geophysics.
Its editor-in-chief is Michael Rycroft;
its 2019 impact factor is 5.544.

References

Springer Science+Business Media academic journals
Earth and atmospheric sciences journals
Geophysics journals